The Journal of Communication is a bimonthly peer-reviewed academic journal that publishes articles and book reviews on a broad range of issues in communication theory and research. It was established in 1951 and the current editor-in-chief is R. Lance Holbert (Temple University). According to the Journal Citation Reports, its 2018 impact factor is 3.753. The Journal of Communication is ranked fifth out of 88 journals in the category "Communication". It is published by Oxford University Press on behalf of the International Communication Association. Previously it was published by Wiley Online Library.

Editors 
The following persons have been editor-in-chief of the journal:

References

External links 
 

Bimonthly journals
English-language journals
Wiley-Blackwell academic journals
Publications established in 1951
Communication journals